Shiva Shankar Lalam, known professionally as Shiva Nirvana, is an Indian film director and screenwriter who works in Telugu cinema. Nirvana has directed three films, Ninnu Kori (2017), Majili (2019) and Tuck Jagadish (2021).

Early life and career 
Nirvana hails from Sabbavaram of Visakhapatnam district, Andhra Pradesh. He graduated with Bachelor of Education and worked as a Biology teacher for two years. Nirvana subsequently moved to Hyderabad and started working as an Assistant director for films like Rakta Charitra (2010) and Solo (2011). His birth name is Siva Sankar Lalam but he adopted the last name Nirvana as he felt "very connected to it" when he came across it for the first time.

Awards and nominations

Filmography

References

External links 
 

Indian film directors
Living people
Telugu film directors
Year of birth missing (living people)